Helvella solitaria is a species of fungus in the family Helvellaceae. Originally described as Peziza solitaria by Petter Karsten in 1869, he  transferred it to the genus Helvella in 1871. The fungus has a boreal and temperate distribution.

Edibility
Consumption of this fungus is not recommended as similar species in the Helvellaceae contain the toxin gyromitrin.

References

solitaria
Fungi described in 1869
Fungi of Europe
Fungi of North America
Taxa named by Petter Adolf Karsten